Emmanuel Kwame "Ymma" Agyeman Boakye (born 25 March 1985 in Ejura, Ghana) is a Ghanaian-Dutch professional footballer who is currently a free agent.

Boakye played for Dutch clubs Sparta Rotterdam, Heracles Almelo and Ajax, Slovenian side ND Mura 05, Åtvidabergs FF in Sweden and most recently the Ghanaian team Asante Kotoko.

Club career
A strong, confident and aggressive attacking right wingback, with much speed and skill, Boakye moved to the Netherlands in 1993, and played for amateur side Zuidvogels (from the town of Huizen) as a child and moved to FC Utrecht youth as a teenager. Ajax scouts discovered him in 2000. The defender, who can play as a right fullback but also in the center of defense, joined the Ajax B1 youth team in 2000.

Ajax
Boakye was first added to the Ajax-1 squad in the fall of 2005 by head-coach Danny Blind, as many Ajax defenders were injured or suspended at the time. The youngster made his first team début on 24 September 2005 in the Eredivisie home game against Roda JC. In total, Emmanuel Boakye had six appearances for Ajax in the Eredivisie, plus another four in the post-season Eredivisie play-offs and one in the Dutch Cup competition.

Ajax offered the player a contract renewal in April 2006, and the Ghanaian started the new season with the first squad, but at the end of the pre-season campaign Ajax and the player agreed that a transfer on loan would be best for his development. Boakye was soon linked with two Eredivisie outfits. When Sparta Rotterdam lost interest the choice for Heracles Almelo was easily made.

Heracles
On 10 August 2006, Ajax defender Boakye was loaned out to Eredivisie side Heracles Almelo for the remainder of the 2006–2007 season, officially until 30 June 2007. Ajax and Heracles agreed a one-year loan deal, effective immediately. The Ghanaian defender extended his Ajax contract until 2008 in April 2006, but would not have seen much action in Amsterdam this season, with defenders such as Jaap Stam, Thomas Vermaelen, Johnny Heitinga and George Ogăraru above him in Henk ten Cate's pecking order.

On 18 June 2007, Boakye made his loan move permanent, sealing a three-year deal with Heracles Almelo from rivals Ajax Amsterdam. He made 61 appearances whilst on loan at Heracles. "We are extremely happy that we could sign such a young and good defender for three years," Heracles Almelo director Nico Jan Hoogma said. "The competition for him was fierce but we nevertheless managed to do it." Boakye opted for Almelo despite offers from Feyenoord, AZ Alkmaar and SC Heerenveen.

In June 2009, Boakye signed for Sparta Rotterdam and played there until 2011 when he was released by the club because he did not follow the clubs rules. In summer 2014, Boakye joined Swedish side Åtvidabergs from Slovenian club Mura 05.

International career
Boakye holds both Ghanaian and Dutch citizenship. He has opted to represent the national team of Ghana.

On 19 January 2007, Boakye was called up by Ghana Olympic coach Jones Attuquayefio into the Ghana Olympic squad for a qualifying match against Burkina Faso's Olympic team in the qualification for the 2008 Summer Olympics. He's a potential player for Ghana Black stars.

Major honors 
 KNVB Cup || 1x || 2005/06
 Johan Cruijff Schaal || 1x || 2006

References

1985 births
Living people
People from Ashanti Region
Ghanaian emigrants to the Netherlands
Association football defenders
Dutch footballers
Ghanaian footballers
AFC Ajax players
Heracles Almelo players
Sparta Rotterdam players
ND Mura 05 players
Åtvidabergs FF players
Asante Kotoko S.C. players
Eredivisie players
Eerste Divisie players
Slovenian PrvaLiga players
Allsvenskan players
Dutch expatriate footballers
Ghanaian expatriate footballers
Expatriate footballers in Slovenia
Expatriate footballers in Sweden
Dutch expatriate sportspeople in Slovenia
Dutch expatriate sportspeople in Sweden